Antheia or Anthea was a town in the Troezene in ancient Argolis, said to have been founded by the mythological figure Anthes. In mythology, King Pittheus transferred the town's population (synoecism) to Troezen.

The site is near modern Damala.

References

Populated places in ancient Argolis
Former populated places in Greece
Locations in Greek mythology